S. poeppigii may refer to:

 Scleria poeppigii, a flowering plant
 Senecio poeppigii, a flowering plant
 Siparuna poeppigii, an aromatic evergreen
 Streptocalyx poeppigii, a plant native to Panama and northern South America
 Syngonium poeppigii, an aroid native to Latin America